The year 1714 in architecture involved some significant events.

Buildings and structures

Buildings

 St Alfege Church, Greenwich, London, designed by Nicholas Hawksmoor, is completed.
 Church of St Mary's, Twickenham, London, designed by John James, is consecrated.
 Church of Santissime Stimmate di San Francesco in Rome, designed by Giovanni Battista Contini, is completed.
 Church of Tolentini, Venice, is completed to designs of 1590 by Vincenzo Scamozzi with a portico by Andrea Tirali.
 Altar of the 22-domed wooden summer Church of the Transfiguration at Kizhi Pogost in Karelia is laid.
 Geffrye Almshouses in London built.
 Summer Palace of Peter the Great in Saint Petersburg, designed by Domenico Trezzini, is completed.
 Bellevue Palace, Kassel, built as an observatory.
 Sint-Lodewijkscollege (Lokeren) in Belgium built as a private house.
 Wotton House in Buckinghamshire, England, is completed.
 Llanelly House in south Wales is built.

Births
 April 1 – Jean-François de Neufforge, Flemish architect and engraver (died 1791)
 Robert Taylor, English architect (died 1788)

Deaths
 May – Andreas Schlüter, German baroque sculptor and architect (born 1664)
 Pietro Perti, Swiss-Italian baroque sculptor and architect working in Lithuania (born 1648)

References

architecture
Years in architecture
18th-century architecture